The Phantom of the Opera is a 1998 Italian horror film directed by Dario Argento, adapted from the 1910 novel Le Fantôme de l'Opéra by Gaston Leroux. However, there are many differences between the book and the film (the biggest being that the Phantom is not disfigured).

Plot 
In 1877 Paris, a pack of rats save an abandoned baby from a basket that was flowing along a river. They raise him in the underground of the Opéra de Paris. This child becomes the Phantom of the Opera, a misanthrope who kills anyone who ventures into his underground chambers, just as rats are killed whenever they venture above ground. The Phantom falls in love with the young opera singer Christine Daaé, while she sings alone on stage one night. He appears before her and tells her that her voice fills his heart with light. After leaving, he speaks to her using telepathy, and the two begin a romantic relationship.

The aristocratic Baron Raoul De Chagny has also fallen in love with Christine, though at first Christine offers him only a platonic relationship. Later, she ruminates that she may be in love with both men. One night, the Phantom calls to her and she descends to his lair across an underground lake in a boat. Upon arriving, she finds him playing an organ and he tells her to sing for him. Christine sings the same song he heard her sing when he first saw her onstage. After making love in his bed, the Phantom reveals his past to her. He tells her to stay in the lair while he goes to secure the role of Juliet for her but she refuses to stay alone, causing him to storm out. Christine grows angry with him, and as he leaves in the boat, she shouts that she hates him.

The Phantom threatens Carlotta, the show's spoiled diva, not to sing but she ignores the warning. During her performance as Juliet, the Phantom brings down the chandelier, injuring many audience members. When he returns to Christine, she refuses the role he has secured for her. He becomes angry and forcefully rapes her. After Christine awakens, she witnesses the Phantom covered in his rats and petting them. While he is playing with the rats, she escapes on the boat. She flees into the arms of Raoul, and they ascend to the roof, where they confess their love for each other. The Phantom watches and breaks down crying when he sees them kiss.

The next night Christine sings as Juliet, but the Phantom swoops down onto the stage, and she faints in his arms. Raoul and the police give chase. The Phantom carries Christine back down below and lays her down. When she awakens, he tells her that she is his, and that they will remain alone together until death. She hits his face with a rock and calls to Raoul for help but instantly regrets her actions, and her feelings for the Phantom return. Raoul appears and shoots the Phantom in his stomach with a rifle. Christine screams and cries for the Phantom, surprising Raoul. 
Though mortally wounded, the Phantom's main concern becomes Christine's safety, as he fears that the police will kill her now they know she is with him. The Phantom leads them to the lake. Raoul and Christine get in the boat but the Phantom remains on the dock and pushes the boat away. He tells Raoul to get out of the cave and out to the river. Raoul does so, ignoring Christine's screams and objections. The Phantom fights the police but is shot multiple times. He hears Christine calling him "my love" and cries out her name before being stabbed in the back then falling into the lake and dying. The rats watch sadly as his body drowns and Christine weeps, heartbroken.

Cast 
 Julian Sands as The Phantom of the Opera
 Asia Argento as Christine Daaé
 Andrea Di Stefano as Raoul, Baron de Chagny
 Nadia Rinaldi as Carlotta Altieri
 Coralina Cataldi-Tassoni as Honorine
 István Bubik as The Rat Catcher
 Lucia Guzzardi as Madame Giry
 Aldo Massasso as Pourdieu
 Zoltan Barabas as Poligny
 Gianni Franco as Montluc
 David D'Ingeo as Alfred
 Kitty Kéri as Paulette
 John Pedeferri as Dr. Princard
 Leonardo Treviglio as Jerome De Chagny
 Massimo Sarchielli as Joseph Buquet

Critical reception 

Critical response to the film was negative. Variety called it "a gothic kitschfest that leaves no excess unexplored", writing "none of your sanitized Andrew Lloyd Webber treatment here, but plenty of bodice-ripping, lush romanticism, gore and gross antics with rats, all of which should tickle the director's stalwart devotees. But the script's clumsy plotting, its often unintentionally hilarious dialogue and some howlingly bad acting make the already widely sold pic likely to function best as a campy video entry for irreverent genre fans." Slant Magazine called it "a hapless failure that could pass for a second-rate B movie that went straight-to-video. After the unfulfilled promises of Trauma and The Stendhal Syndrome, The Phantom of the Opera seemingly signaled the demise of a great auteur."

On Rotten Tomatoes,  the film has an approval rating of 10% based on reviews from 10 critics.

Soundtrack 
The score was composed by Ennio Morricone and featured the "Air des clochettes" from the opera Lakmé by Léo Delibes and the overture from Charles Gounod's Faust.

See also 
 Pertosa Caves

References

External links 

 
 
 

1998 films
Italian horror films
1990s Italian-language films
1990s French-language films
Films directed by Dario Argento
Films based on horror novels
Films based on The Phantom of the Opera
Films set in France
Films shot in Hungary
Films shot in Italy
1998 horror films
Gothic horror films
Films scored by Ennio Morricone
Films about rape
Films with screenplays by Dario Argento
1990s English-language films